The Ness of Brodgar is an archaeological site covering  between the Ring of Brodgar and the Stones of Stenness in the Heart of Neolithic Orkney World Heritage Site in Orkney, Scotland. Excavations at the site began in 2003. The earliest structures were built between 3,300 and 3,200 BC, and the site had been closed down and partly dismantled by 2,200 BC. It was the main subject of a 2016 BBC Scotland documentary, Britain’s Ancient Capital: Secrets of Orkney, presented by Neil Oliver, Chris Packham, Shini Somara, Andy Torbet and Doug Allan.
For preservation, the site is closed during the winter months and covered in polyethylene plastic and tyres to protect it from the environment.

The site

Today the Brodgar peninsula is a finger of land a few hundred metres wide, situated between the brackish Loch of Stenness to the southwest and the freshwater Loch of Harray to the northeast.

To the southeast are the Standing Stones of Stenness and to the north-west is the Ring of Brodgar. A short bridge connects these two sites. Also visible from the site are, to the east, the chambered cairn at Maeshowe and, to the southeast the Barnhouse Settlement. A couple of kilometres northwest of the Ring of Brodgar is the Ring of Bookan, a third henge, with associated mounds. The Neolithic village at Skara Brae lies a few kilometres away, as does the chambered cairn at Unstan. More archaeology is probably submerged beneath the lochs.

In Neolithic times, the Loch of Stenness was probably a wetland area rather than a lake. People from Skara Brae would have been able to walk to the Ness of Brodgar, watch or take part in ritual activity and walk home within a day.

The structures at the Ness of Brodgar are made of flagstone, a sedimentary rock found abundantly throughout Orkney. Flagstone is easily split into flat stones and was therefore a good material for fine building  work using Neolithic tools. Some of the stone found on site is too thin for floor tiles or wall building, and is understood as the first evidence ever found of roofs.

Key structures
The structures at Brodgar are numbered in the order of discovery. As more of the site was uncovered and the interpretations improved, some numbers went out of use, so as of 2016 the key structures are numbered 1, 8, 10, 12 and 14.

Structures 1, 8, 12 and 14 appear to have been constructed around 3,000 BC.  These stand on top of earlier remains that, as of 2016, have not yet been uncovered, but are thought to date to 3,300–3,200 BC.

Structure 1
 
Structure 1 has a complex history and appears to have been built on top of the remains of an earlier structure. The official guide to the dig suggests that this structure appears to have been central to the site. It was decorated with many pieces of stone artwork, some of which were internal to the walls and would never have been seen while the building was in use.

Some of the individual stones of structure 1 were painted in yellows, reds, and oranges using ochre pigment made of haematite mixed with animal fat, milk or eggs. This is the first discovery in Britain of evidence that Neolithic people used paint to decorate their buildings.

In 2015 the bones of a baby, which died around the time of birth, were unearthed in a recess of this building.

Structure 8
 
Structure 8 is roughly contemporary with structure 1, probably having been built just after structure 1 was completed. It comprised ten piers and ten recesses, and had six hearths. The remains of at least two earlier buildings lie beneath it and structure 8 appears to have undergone severe subsidence itself. Its floor slumped in antiquity, causing the roof to fall in, and some of its stones were used to form structure 10.

Structure 8 was the first place where stone roof tiles were discovered on site and the first place where coloured pigment was found on the walls.

Uniquely among the buildings of the Ness of Brodgar, and indeed uniquely in Neolithic Europe so far as is known, finely-worked stone spatulas were found here. They resemble flattened spoons and have been made with great care. None of them show signs of wear and their purpose is unknown. Other finds from this structure included a whalebone mace head and a whale's tooth set in stone.

Structure 10

Structure 10 was discovered in 2008, and was described by excavators as "temple-like". There is a cross-shaped inner sanctum and the building was surrounded by a paved outer passage. It is believed to have been constructed around 2,900 BC, and appears to have been partly rebuilt around 2,800 BC, probably due to structural instability. This is the largest structure of its kind anywhere in the north of Britain and it would have dominated the ritual landscape of the peninsula.

Structure 10 was used until around 2,400–2,200 BC, when it appears to have been "closed" in an extraordinary and unique episode of ceremonial demolition involving the slaughter of several hundred cattle. Tibias (shin bones) of approximately 400 cattle comprise the vast majority of bones found. The bones were laid around structure 10 and an upturned cow skull was placed within it. The tibias appear to have been cracked to extract the marrow, suggesting that this slaughter was accompanied by a feast. All the slaughter seems to have taken place in a single event.

After the feast, the whole carcasses of several red deer were placed atop the broken bones, and structure 10 was largely destroyed. This event appears to have marked the closure and abandonment of the Ness of Brodgar site.

Structure 12
 
Structure 12 was built around 3,000 BC. It comprises six piers, four recesses and two hearths.  It is the southernmost structure so far uncovered, but there are believed to be more structures farther south still underground (some of which, unfortunately, may be under the site's spoil heap). It was made of well-dressed stone but, like several other buildings on the site, appears to have suffered from structural problems and was partly rebuilt. An annexe to the north, added later in the Neolithic, is not well integrated into the original stonework.

This annexe contained masses of grooved ware pottery, including some very large vessels, some made with techniques not otherwise known from the Neolithic, and some coloured black, red or white. The red colour was made of ochre, and the black of soot; the source of the white colouring has not yet been determined.

The grooved ware from Orkney is the oldest known in Britain, and the style appears to originate from Orkney and radiate southwards.

Structure 14

Structure 14 was built around 3,000 BC, roughly contemporaneously with structures 1, 8 and 12. Like them it was built on top of earlier structures. It is the most northerly of the buildings so far uncovered. It has three entrances, four piers, four recesses, and two hearths. Apart from its size it is generally similar in design to structure 8.

A great deal of stone from structure 14 was taken in antiquity for re-use elsewhere, and like all the other structures except structure 10, it appears to have been largely demolished by 2,600 BC.

The ends of this building appear to have been used for different purposes and, as of 2016, the floor is undergoing chemical analysis to determine what they were.

An unusual axehead, made from gneiss, and a carinated bowl from the early Neolithic which may predate grooved ware, have been found in this structure.

Timeline

Finds

Excavations have revealed several buildings, both ritual and domestic, and the works suggest there are likely to be more in the vicinity. Pottery, cremated animal bones, stone tools, and polished stone mace heads have been discovered. Some of the stone slabs are decorated with geometrical lozenges typical of other Neolithic sites.

It appears to traverse the entire peninsula where the site is located, and may have been a symbolic barrier between the ritual landscape of the Ring and the mundane world around it.

A baked clay artefact known as the "Brodgar Boy", and thought to be a figurine with a head, body, and two eyes, was unearthed in the rubble of one structure in 2011. It was found in two sections, the smaller of which measures 30 mm, but is thought to be part of a still larger object.

In 2013, an intricately inscribed stone was found in structure 10, described as "potentially the finest example of Neolithic art found in the UK for several decades". The stone is inscribed on both sides. A few days later archaeologists discovered a carved stone ball, a very rare find of such an object in situ in "a modern archaeological context".

Later finds include Skaill knives and hammer stones, and another, perhaps even bigger wall. The dig involves archaeologists from Orkney College and from the universities of Aberdeen, Cardiff and Glasgow.

World Heritage status
The Heart of Neolithic Orkney was inscribed as a World Heritage site in December 1999. In addition to the Ring of Brodgar, the site includes Maeshowe, Skara Brae, the Stones of Stenness, and other nearby sites. It is managed by Historic Scotland, whose "Statement of Significance" for the site begins:
The monuments at the heart of Neolithic Orkney and Skara Brae proclaim the triumphs of the human spirit in early ages and isolated places. They were approximately contemporary with the mastabas of the archaic period of Egypt (first and second dynasties), the brick temples of Sumeria, and the first cities of the Harappa culture in India, and a century or two earlier than the Golden Age of China. Unusually fine for their early date, and with a remarkably rich survival of evidence, these sites stand as a visible symbol of the achievements of early peoples away from the traditional centres of civilisation. ... Stenness is a unique and early expression of the ritual customs of the people who buried their dead in tombs like Maes Howe and lived in settlements like Skara Brae.

Since the importance of the Ness was discovered only in 2003, it was not mentioned explicitly in 1999 and was not one of the four key sites. Nevertheless, the Ness of Brodgar "contribute[s] greatly to our understanding of the WHS" according to Historic Scotland.

See also
 Westray Wife – another Neolithic figurine discovered in Orkney.
 Skara Brae – a stone-built Neolithic settlement, located on the Bay of Skaill.
 UHI Archaeology Institute

Bibliography

References

External links
  
 
  – includes video of site

 

4th-millennium BC architecture in Scotland
Archaeological sites in Orkney
Prehistoric Orkney
Stone Age sites in Scotland
Former populated places in Scotland
Neolithic sites
Neolithic settlements
Neolithic Scotland
Mainland, Orkney